The William and Mousie Powell Award is an award given each year since 1986 by the LPGA Tour to a player who "whose behavior and deeds best exemplifies the spirit, ideals and values of the LPGA." The recipient is selected annually by a vote of LPGA Tour members. The award was renamed to the Founders Award in 2019.

It was established by Mousie Powell, an honorary member and longtime supporter of the LPGA, and named in honor of Powell and her husband, William Powell, a Hollywood actor of the mid-twentieth century.

Winners

1986 Kathy Whitworth
1987 Nancy Lopez
1988 Marlene Hagge
1989 Heather Farr
1990 Judy Dickinson
1991 Pat Bradley
1992 Shelley Hamlin
1993 Alice Miller
1994 Jill Briles-Hinton
1995 JoAnne Carner
1996 Betsy King
1997 Sherri Turner
1998 Judy Rankin
1999 Meg Mallon
2000 Lorie Kane
2001 Wendy Ward
2002 Gail Graham
2003 Suzy Whaley
2004 Juli Inkster
2005 Heather Daly-Donofrio
2006 Vicki Goetze-Ackerman
2007 Natalie Gulbis
2008 Hilary Lunke
2009 Lorena Ochoa
2010–11 No award
2012 Ai Miyazato
2013 Amanda Blumenherst
2014 Chella Choi
2015 Juli Inkster
2016 Karrie Webb
2017 Katherine Kirk
2018 So Yeon Ryu
2019 Brooke Henderson
2020 No award
2021 Lydia Ko

References

External links
LPGA – Berg, Farr, Powell, and Zaharias Award Winners

Golf awards in the United States
LPGA Tour
Awards established in 1986
1986 establishments in the United States